Cara Black and Liezel Huber were the defending champions, and won in the final 7–5, 6–2, against Jie Zheng and Zi Yan.

Seeds

Draw

Draw

External links
Draw

2008 Dubai Tennis Championships
Dubai Tennis Championships